Amarok, named after the Eskimo word for 'wolf', are a Spanish progressive rock band, with mediterranean and  Middle Ages musical influences. The group was founded in 1990 by Robert Santamaría and Lídia Cerón.

The band address environmental issues, and much of their material is recorded using solar powered equipment.

Discography
 Els nostres petits amics (recorded in a home studio using solar powered equipment)
 Canciones de los mundos perdidos (1995, Lyricon)
 Gibra'ara (1998, Beringia)
 Tierra de especias (2000, recorded using only solar energy)
 Mujer Luna (2002)
 Quentadharkën (2004, Tecnosaga)
 Sol De Medianoche (2007)
 Gouveia 2005 (2011)
 Hayat Yolunda (Path Of Life) (2015)
 El Ojo Del Mundo (2021)

External links
 Amarok website
 

Spanish musical groups